A public call office (PCO) is a payphone facility located in a public place in India and Pakistan. It is also another name in the United Kingdom for a public telephone box (postal addresses for these kiosks sometimes include "PCO").

India

In India, staffed and automated (coin-operated payphone) versions of the service are in existence. BSNL, a public sector corporation, has the largest installation of PCOs in India. Mr. R. L. Dube, a Dept of Telecom officer, introduced concept of PCOs in India. As of 2006 there were about 4.2 million (42 lakh) PCOs operating in India, according to the Telecom Regulatory Authority of India (TRAI).

Private sector operators such as Reliance Infocomm, Tata Indicom, Hutch, Idea and Airtel predominantly are prepaid PCO providers and have a moderate number of PCOs in the public landscape.

There are two types of PCOs: landline and wireless. The wireless PCOs use two technologies: CDMA and GSM. Reliance and Tata Indicom are CDMA-based prepaid PCO connection providers. Airtel, Idea and Hutch are GSM-based prepaid PCO connection providers. Initially, the Dept of Telecom, and later BSNL, MTNL and Airtel provided fixed landline postpaid PCO connections. BSNL and MTNL also provide prepaid PCOs.

PICoF (public Internet café on fiber) 
In BSNL, which is the largest public sector telecom company of India, its Bhopal Unit has for the first time started an Internet café on optical fiber. On August 18, 2013, at Neelbadh locality of Bhopal, the chief general manager of MP Unit of BSNL, Mr. N. K. Yadav, and senior general manager of Bhopal Unit, Mr. Mahesh Shukla, inaugurated PICoF (public Internet café on fiber) at the shop of Mr. Deepak Verma, who was previously running an internet café on a broadband connection provided through copper lines.

Pakistan
In Pakistan, PCOs are provided by Pakistan Telecommunication Company (PTCL), Dancom, Worldcall, and Telecard, amongst others. These companies usually provide calling-card-based domestic and international telecom services.

US
In the US, staffed and automated (coin-operated payphone) versions of the service are in existence, provided by operators like Verizon and SBC Telecom (credit card operated).

See also
Telephone Exchange
Wireless Exchange

References 

Public phones
Indian words and phrases
Telecommunications in Pakistan
Telecommunications in India